The Copenhagen Formation is a geologic formation in Nevada.

Areas it is found include the Antelope Valley region of Eureka County and Nye County.

It preserves fossils dating back to the Ordovician period.

See also

 List of fossiliferous stratigraphic units in Nevada
 Paleontology in Nevada

References
 

Ordovician geology of Nevada
Geography of Eureka County, Nevada
Geography of Nye County, Nevada
Ordovician System of North America
Geologic formations of Nevada
Ordovician southern paleotropical deposits